Naba Baongo II is the current Mogho Naba, the king of the Mossi people of Burkina Faso. According to oral tradition, he is the 37th king of the Mossi.

References 

 Benoit Beucher, Manger le pouvoir au Burkina Faso. La noblesse mossi à l'épreuve de l'Histoire, Karthala, 2017, 348 p.

Burkinabé royalty
Mossi people
Living people
Year of birth missing (living people)